Estádio Adelino Ribeiro Novo is a multi-use stadium in Barcelos, Portugal.  It was used mostly for football matches and hosted the home matches of Gil Vicente F.C. The stadium was able to hold 7,000 people. In 2004, Gil Vicente started playing in the new Estádio Cidade de Barcelos, using Estádio Adelino Ribeiro Novo only for training, friendly games and youth squads.

References

Multi-purpose stadiums in Portugal
Sports venues completed in 1924
Gil Vicente F.C.